"Tell Me There's a Heaven" is a song by British singer-songwriter Chris Rea, released in 1990 as the third single from his tenth studio album The Road to Hell (1989). It was written by Rea and produced by Rea and Jon Kelly. "Tell Me There's a Heaven" reached No. 24 in the UK Singles Chart and remained in the Top 100 for six weeks.

In 1994, the single was re-issued from Rea's compilation album The Best of Chris Rea. It re-charted at No. 70 in the UK in December 1994. Another re-issue in 2000 saw the song peak at No. 11 on the Ö3 Austria Top 40 chart.

Background
Rea was inspired to write "Tell Me There's a Heaven" after his daughter Josie saw footage of a riot in South Africa on the news, which showed "this horrible thing of throwing lighted tyres over people" and "one guy burning to death". Rea recalled to Peter Doggett in 2019: "Joan's [Rea's wife] dad was saying he didn't know what to say to Josie about what she'd seen, so he just said, 'That man has gone to heaven'. And that's how songs happen. I went up to see her and she was safely asleep, so I looked out the window and said to myself, 'Grandad told you there's a heaven, I'd like someone to tell me there's a heaven, too.'"

In 1992, the song was used as the soundtrack to a PIF for the NSPCC, juxtaposed with excuses made by child abusers and descriptions of injuries from coroner reports.

Critical reception
On its release, Music & Media wrote, "A slow, gentle and intimate song with some tastefully arranged strings. Perfect for late-night and AC programmers." Eleanor Levy of Record Mirror wrote, "A simple piano backing erupts into a full blown orchestral arrangement as Rea uses a four minute pop song to try to come to terms with the serious subject of child abuse." She considered the song to be "sincere" and one that avoided being "over-sentimental" and "schmaltzy", but questioned the suitability of releasing a song "so obviously written to be heard within the context of an album" as a single.

In a review of The Road to Hell, David Law of The Charlatan felt the song "sums up both Rea's disillusionment and his hopes for the future", but felt it would have been "more effective shrouded in simple acoustic guitar and piano" than the "John Williams-type soundtrack strings". Deborah Hornblow of the Hartford Courant described the song as a "good track" which "begs questions a child would ask on seeing the world's unkindness". John Everson of the Southtown Star considered the song to be "astounding in emotion and lyrical sweep".

Track listing

Original release
7" single
 "Tell Me There's a Heaven" – 6:01
 "And When She Smiles" – 3:11

12" single
 "Tell Me There's a Heaven" – 6:01
 "And When She Smiles" – 3:11
 "Curse of the Traveller" – 6:25

CD single
 "Tell Me There's a Heaven" – 6:01
 "And When She Smiles" – 3:11
 "Curse of the Traveller" – 6:25
 "Little Blonde Plaits" – 4:16

1994 release
CD single
 "Tell Me There's a Heaven" – 6:01
 "Stainsby Girls" – 4:06
 "Let's Dance" – 4:15

CD single (promo release)
 "Tell Me There's a Heaven" (Edit) – 4:55
 "Tell Me There's a Heaven" (Album Version) – 6:01
 "Stainsby Girls" – 4:06
 "Let's Dance" – 4:15
 "Driving Home for Christmas" – 3:58

2000 release
CD single
 "Tell Me There's a Heaven" – 6:01
 "Sail Away" – 4:48
 "Sandwriting" – 5:08

Personnel
Tell Me There's a Heaven
 Chris Rea - vocals, guitars, keyboards
 Max Middleton - keyboards, string arrangement
 Robert Ahwai - bass
 Martin Ditcham - drums, percussion

Production
 Chris Rea - producer of "Tell Me There's a Heaven" and "And When She Smile", producer and mixing on "Curse of the Traveller", producer of "Little Blonde Plaits"
 Jon Kelly - producer of "Tell Me There's a Heaven", mixing on "Curse of the Traveller"
 Dave Richards - producer of "And When She Smiles" and "Little Blonde Plaits"
 Neil Amor, Diane BJ Koné - engineers on "Tell Me There's a Heaven"

Other
 The Leisure Process - sleeve design
 Christian Charisius - back cover photography

Charts

References

1989 songs
1990 singles
1994 singles
2000 singles
Chris Rea songs
Warner Records singles
East West Records singles
Songs written by Chris Rea